A vortex is a dynamic phenomenon of fluids.

Vortex may also refer to:

Physics 
 Vortex ring, a torus-shaped vortex in a fluid or gas
 Vorticity, a mathematical concept used in fluid dynamics
 Quantum vortex, a topological defect exhibited in superfluids and superconductors
 Autowave vortex, in active media described by parabolic equation with non-linear free member of a special form

Books 
 The Vortex, a play by Noël Coward
 The Vortex (novel), a 1924 novel by Colombian author José Eustasio Rivera
 Vortex (Cleary novel), a 1978 novel by Australian author Jon Cleary
 Vortex (Bond and Larkin novel), a 1991 war novel by Larry Bond and Patrick Larkin
 Vortex (Wilson novel), a 2011 science fiction novel by Robert Charles Wilson, the sequel to Axis

Film and TV 
 The Vortex (film), a 1927 film adaptation of the Noël Coward play
 Vortex, or Vortex, the Face of Medusa, a 1967 Greek film
 Vortex (1981 film), written and directed by Scott B and Beth B
 Vortex (2009 film)
 Vortex (2021 film)
 Vortex (Transformers), a member of the Combaticons from Transformers who transforms into a helicopter
 Cindy Vortex, a fictional character in the Jimmy Neutron cartoon franchise
 Vortex, a planet in the Star Wars franchise

Television 
 "Vortex" (Star Trek: Deep Space Nine), a 1993 first-season episode of Star Trek: Deep Space Nine
 Vortex (Smallville), the first episode in Season 2 of Smallville
 Vortex (YTV), an anime programming block produced by YTV and hosted by Paula Lemyre
 Vortexx, a defunct Saturday morning children's programming block on The CW

Gaming 
 Vortex (Amiga video game), a 1989 video game from Visionary Design Technologies
 Vortex (video game), a 1994 game developed by Argonaut Software for the Super Nintendo Entertainment System
 Vortex (PC game), a 1994 game developed by the X-Files development crew
 Vortex (iPod game), a 2006 iPod game developed by Apple Computer
 Vortex Software, a defunct video game developer
 Vortex (Dungeons & Dragons), a creature in the Dungeons & Dragons series

Roller coasters 
 Vortex (Calaway Park)
 Vortex (California's Great America), a stand-up roller coaster at California's Great America in Santa Clara, California, United States
 Vortex (Canada's Wonderland), a suspended roller coaster at Canada's Wonderland in Vaughan, Ontario, Canada
 Vortex (Carowinds), a stand-up roller coaster at Carowinds in Charlotte, North Carolina, United States
 Vortex (Kings Island), a steel roller coaster at Kings Island in Mason, Ohio, United States
 Vortex (Thorpe Park), at Thorpe Park, Surrey, England

Music 
 ICS Vortex (born 1974), Norwegian metal singer and bassist
 Vortex I: A Biodegradable Festival of Life, a state-sponsored music festival held in 1970 in Estacada, Oregon
 Vortex Jazz Club, a London venue

Albums 
 Vortex (album), a remix album by Collide
 Vortex (Derek Sherinian album), a studio album by Derek Sherinian

Songs 
 "Vortex" (song), a 2011 song by The Gazette
 "Vortex", a song by Megadeth from Cryptic Writings
 "Vortex", a song by Final Exposure (Joey Beltram and Richie Hawtin)

Technology and business 
 Subaru Vortex, a sport coupe sold from 1985 to 1991 by Subaru
 Aureal Vortex, the PC audio accelerator chipset which powered such sound cards as the Monster Sound MX300
 Vortex (satellite), a class of United States Reconnaissance satellites
 Vortex mixer, a laboratory device used to mix vials of liquid
 Vortex86, a x86 compatible System-on-a-chip CPU
 Sport Copter Vortex, an American gyroplane design
 Vortex (software), a physics software development kit
 VORTEX projects, Verification of the Origins of Rotation in Tornadoes Experiment
 Vortex Bladeless, a Spanish company developing wind power generators
 Vortex Optics, an American maker of optical equipment
 Vortex ring toy, a toy that generates vortex rings
 Air vortex cannon, a toy that releases doughnut-shaped air vortices
 Vortex ring gun, an experimental non-lethal weapon for crowd control

Other uses 
 Spiritual vortex, in New Age thought, any of several places, such as Sedona, Arizona, where the earth's energy is purported to be released

See also 
 Vortex theory (disambiguation)
 Cyclonic vortex (disambiguation)